William Chase Tatum (November 3, 1973 – March 23, 2008) was an American professional wrestler and actor, best known for his appearances in World Championship Wrestling, and as an actor, in the 2007 film Who's Your Caddy?.

Career

Professional wrestling 
At age 19, Tatum won the Mr. Georgia bodybuilding competition. In 1998, he signed with the Atlanta-based World Championship Wrestling promotion. Working as a personal trainer, a person who worked for WCW reportedly encouraged Tatum to try out. After beginning his career as a jobber, he debuted on the March 28th episode of WCW Saturday Night with a loss to Scott Norton. 

A year or so later, Tatum became a member of rapper Master P's No Limit Soldiers and feuded with The West Texas Rednecks. In 1999, he faced such wrestlers as Curt Hennig on an episode of WCW Thunder and WCW Television Champion Rick Steiner on WCW Monday Nitro. He lost both matches but wrestled Mikey Whipwreck to a draw on the August 23 episode of WCW Monday Nitro.

Tatum's wrestling career lasted less than two years and left him with severe back problems which required back surgery. Without any health indemnification, he developed a dependence to analgesics.

Post-wrestling 
In 2007, Tatum appeared in the comedy film Who's Your Caddy? alongside rapper Big Boi of Outkast. He also worked as a road manager and personal assistant for the band, and relished his time with them as he got to travel with the members and see Paris, Germany, and Japan.

Death
Tatum was found dead at his home in Atlanta, Georgia's Buckhead neighborhood after an apparent accidental drug overdose, on March 23, 2008. His father states that Tatum was planning to enter a rehab facility to help overcome his addiction.

See also
 List of premature professional wrestling deaths

References

External links 
 
 Outkast Road Manager/Former Wrestler Found Dead
 Chase Tatum IMDb Profile
 Chase Tatum IMDb Resume

1973 births
2008 deaths
Accidental deaths in Georgia (U.S. state)
American bodybuilders
American male professional wrestlers
Drug-related deaths in Georgia (U.S. state)